Ak-Suu is a village in the Chüy Region of Kyrgyzstan. Its population was 9,677 in 2021. It is the center of the Birinchi May rural community (ayyl aymagy) of the Moskva District. It is situated adjacent to the district center Belovodskoye.

Population

References 

Populated places in Chüy Region